Spin Fighters were die-cast metal top toys that were manufactured by Bandai in China from 1993 to 1997. The tops were loaded into launchers (later, called "power launchers"), which were then tightly wound by fingertip, and subsequently released into the Spin Fighters Battle Arena or onto a flat surface. The tops battled (hitting against each other) until the last top spinning was the winner. Spin Fighters tops were about 1 inch across, came in black and gold colors, and bore a prismatic sticker with a character from a TV show or video game. Usually, the black tops represented the "bad guys" and the gold tops represented the "good guys". Spin Fighters were sold two to a package, one gold and one black. Power Launchers and Battle Arenas were available separately or bundled. The tops can be disassembled and worn on jackets, shirts and hats, through any small button hole. Production of Spin Fighters ceased around 1997. They are widely seen as the forerunner to Beyblade, which began production in 1997.

Series
Spin Fighters series included World Wrestling Federation (WWF), Saban's Mighty Morphin Power Rangers and Capcom's Street Fighter.

Later, Mighty Morphin Power Rangers "Turbo Launchers" were available, each with an exclusive matching "Power Coin" Spin Fighter. However, they were only made for the Black, Blue, Pink and White Rangers. Turbo Launchers did not require fingertips to wind. Instead, a wheel on the side was rolled against a table to wind the launcher.

Special sets
The Mighty Morphin Power Rangers Tournament set consisted of a cardboard storage box, all 25 series 2 Spin Fighters, a red Power Pit Battle Arena and two Launchers. It was available by mail, starting in 1994, through various store catalogs, including JC Penney, Sears, K·B Toys and Toys "R" Us. While the packaging says "Exclusive Zordon Spin Fighter only available in this set!", it was also sold bundled with the Lord Zedd Spin Fighter, the "Thunder Stadium" Battle Arena and two Mini Launchers.

A Street Fighter II Turbo box set, exclusive to Japan, had 24 blue Spin Fighters. It consisted of a cardboard box containing 12 different Spin Fighters and their duplicates, each in an individual protective storage case. The character stickers were not holographic and had different images from those available in North American and European markets.

A Street Fighter II Turbo Tournament Set, exclusive to Japan, consisted of a cardboard storage box, black and gold Japan-exclusive Spin Fighters, a purple Battle Arena, two Launchers and a clear plastic cup (the purpose of which is known only to those who can read Japanese). (UPC:4902425393476)

Errors 
There are 3 naming errors in Mighty Morphin Power Rangers - series 1. Mutitis is incorrectly called Thornos, Hatchasaurus is called Hatchling, and Colossus is labeled as Knight in Shiny Mirrors.

There is one1 naming error in Mighty Morphin Power Rangers - series 2. Octophantom is incorrectly called Elepus.

There are two missing from Mighty Morphin Power Rangers - series 3. It remains unclear why Turbo Launchers were not made to match the Red and Yellow Rangers (The Green Ranger, Tommy Oliver, had become the White Ranger by this point in time, so a Green Ranger Turbo Launcher would not have made sense canonically). Also, the stickers are holographic at the outer edge only, rather than prismatic over the entire surface, like series 1 and 2. Production models do not match prototypes seen on the back of the packaging for the Thunder Stadium, which had the color fields flipped, thereby providing a more pleasing and accurate color when spinning. Furthermore, the design on the White Ranger's Power Coin is wrong, both the Turbo Launcher and the matching Spin Fighter. It shows a White Tiger Power Coin, which was never seen on the show. (The correct White Ranger Power Coin is supposed to resemble the distinctive markings seen on a Tiger's forehead.)

List of Spin Fighters sets

Spin Fighters Starter (1993)
 Spin Fighter Mascot (Gold) / Spin Fighter Mascot (Black) (Bundled with Launcher)
 Spin Fighter Mascot (Gold) / Spin Fighter Mascot (Black) (Bundled with Battle Arena and Launcher)

Street Fighter II Turbo (1993)
 Guile (Gold) / Balrog (Black) (UPC:045557021108)
 E. Honda (Gold) / Ryu (Black) (UPC:045557021108) - Double "Good Guy" Pack
 Zangief (Gold) / M. Bison (Black) (UPC:045557021108)
 Blanka (Gold) / Sagat (Black) (UPC:045557021108)
 Dhalsim (Gold) / Ken (Black) (UPC:045557021108) - Double "Good Guy" Pack
 Chun Li (Gold) / Vega (Black) (UPC:045557021108)

Mighty Morphin Power Rangers - series 1 (1993) 
 Red Ranger / Rita Repulsa (Bundled with "Communicator" Power Launcher - UPC:045557022853)
 Red Ranger / Rita Repulsa (Bundled with Blue Battle Arena and "Communicator" Power Launcher - UPC:069545022885)
 Blue Ranger / Hatchling (UPC:045557022808)
 Green Ranger / Squatt (UPC:045557022808)
 Black Ranger / Finster (UPC:045557022808)
 Pink Ranger / Knight in Shiny Mirrors (UPC:045557022808)
 Yellow Ranger / King Sphinx (UPC:045557022808)
 Alpha 5 / Goldar (UPC:045557022808)
 Mammoth Dinozord / Polluticorn (UPC:045557022808)
 T-Rex Dinozord / Bones (UPC:045557022808)
 Megazord / Pineoctopus (UPC:045557022808)
 Dragonzord / Eye Guy (UPC:045557022808)
 Mega-Dragonzord / Thornos (UPC:045557022808)
 Titanus / Baboo (UPC:045557022808)
 Ultrazord / Rita Repulsa (Bundled with Blue Battle Arena - UPC:045557022884)
 Ultrazord / Rita Repulsa (Bundled with Red Battle Arena and Launcher)

PLANNED, BUT NEVER PRODUCED OR RELEASED:
 Ultrazord / Scorpina [Woman] (Bundled with Blue Battle Area)

Mighty Morphin Power Rangers - series 2 (1994)
 Jason / Salaguana (UPC:045557021405)
 Kimberly / Guitardo (UPC:045557021405)
 Trini / Pirantis Head (UPC:045557021405)
 Billy / Scorpina [Monster Form] (UPC:045557021405)
 Zack / Invenusable Fly Trap (UPC:045557021405)
 Tommy / Turban Shell (UPC:045557021405)
 White Ranger / Elepus (UPC:045557021405)
 White Tigerzord / The Primator (UPC:045557021405)
 Red Dragon Thunderzord / Robogoat (UPC:045557021405)
 Thunder Megazord / Bulk (UPC:045557021405)
 Thunder Ultrazord / Skull (UPC:045557021405)
 Thunderzord Assault Team / Lord Zedd (UPC:045557021405)
 Zordon (Exclusive to The Mighty Morphin Power Rangers Tournament Set - UPC:045557021993)
 Zordon/Lord Zedd (Bundled with "Thunder Stadium" Battle Arena, and 2 exclusive Purple and Green Mini Launchers)

Mighty Morphin Power Rangers - series 3 (1995)
 Pterodactyl Power Coin Emblem (Bundled with Pink Turbo Launcher - UPC:3296580022861)
 Mastodon Power Coin Emblem (Bundled with Black Turbo Launcher - UPC:3296580022861)
 Triceratops Power Coin Emblem (Bundled with Blue Turbo Launcher - UPC:3296580022861)
 White Tigerzord Power Coin Emblem (Bundled with White Turbo Launcher - UPC:3296580022861)

World Wrestling Federation - WWF (1994)
 The Undertaker / Yokozuna (UPC:045557021207)
 Shawn Michaels / Doink the Clown (UPC:045557021207)
 Bret "Hitman" Hart / Adam Bomb (UPC:045557021207)
 Razor Ramon / Bam Bam Bigelow (UPC:045557021207)
 Tatanka / Evil Crush (UPC:045557021207)
 Lex Luger / Ludvig Borga (UPC:045557021207)

See also
 Beyblade

1990s toys
Tops